Tabebuia bibracteolata is a species of plant in the family Bignoniaceae. It is endemic to Cuba.

References

Flora of Cuba
bibracteolata
Vulnerable plants
Taxonomy articles created by Polbot